The Treaty of Berlin was concluded on 2 May 1715, during the Great Northern War. It allied George I of Great Britain, as Elector of Hanover, with Denmark-Norway, in return for the cession to Hanover of the Swedish dominion of Bremen-Verden, which was occupied by Denmark. With the treaty, Denmark and Hanover joined the Russo-Prussian coalition that had been established by the Treaty of Schwedt. Denmark was assured the gain of yet-to-be-conquered Stralsund.

References

External links
Scan of the treaty at IEG Mainz
Annotated edition of the treaty at IEG Mainz

Berlin
1715 treaties
Treaties of Denmark–Norway
Treaties of the Electorate of Brunswick-Lüneburg
1715 in Europe